Synodus randalli is a species of lizardfish that lives mainly in the Western Indian Ocean and the Red Sea.

Information
Synodus randalli can be found in a marine environment within a benthopelagic range. This species is native to a tropical climate. Synodus randalli have an average length of 11.3 centimeters or 4.4 inches as an unsexed male. They live in salt water systems.

References

Notes
 

Synodontidae
Fish described in 1981